The t Hooft symbol is a collection of numbers which allows one to express the generators of the SU(2) Lie algebra in terms of the generators of Lorentz algebra. The symbol is a blend between the Kronecker delta and the Levi-Civita symbol. It was introduced by Gerard 't Hooft. It is used in the construction of the BPST instanton.

ηaμν is the 't Hooft symbol:

In other words, they are defined by

()

where the latter are the anti-self-dual 't Hooft symbols.

More explicitly, these symbols are

and

Properties 

They satisfy the self-duality and the anti-self-duality properties:

Some other properties are

 
 
 
 

The same holds for  except for

and

Obviously  due to different
duality properties.

Many properties of these are tabulated in the appendix of 't Hooft's paper and also in the article by Belitsky et al.

See also

Instanton
 't Hooft anomaly
't Hooft–Polyakov monopole
't Hooft loop

References

Gauge theories
Mathematical symbols